Kileh Sefid or Keyleh Sefid may refer to:
 Kileh Sefid, Kermanshah
 Kileh Sefid, Kurdistan